Latin School may refer to:
 Latin schools of Medieval Europe
Several schools in the United States:
 Boston Latin School, Boston, MA
 Boys' Latin School of Maryland, Baltimore, MD
 Brooklyn Latin School, New York, NY
 Cambridge Rindge and Latin School in Cambridge, Massachusetts
 Charlotte Latin School, Charlotte, NC
 Covington Latin School, Covington, KY
 Highlands Latin School, Louisville, KY
 the 6th to 8th grade program at Kellenberg Memorial High School, Long Island, NY
 Latin School of Chicago, Chicago, IL
 Roxbury Latin School, Roxbury, MA
 Washington Latin Public Charter School, Washington, DC